The Sleeping Beauty Rock is a rock in Green Island, Taitung County, Taiwan.

History
The rock is a residual volcanic wall. The rock was formed slowly after different parts of the crater eroded by sea and wind over time.

Name
The rock was name Sleeping Beauty Rock because the shape resembles a Sleeping Beauty.

See also
 Geology of Taiwan

References

Landforms of Pingtung County
Rock formations of Taiwan